Stary Żmigród  (until 1968 Żmigród Stary) is a village in the administrative district of Gmina Nowy Żmigród, within Jasło County, Subcarpathian Voivodeship, in south-eastern Poland.

References

Villages in Jasło County